The St. Laurent Ferry is a cable ferry in the Canadian province of Saskatchewan. The ferry crosses the South Saskatchewan River, linking Grid Road 783 on the river's west bank with Grid Road 782 on the east bank, near St. Laurent de Grandin.

The six-car ferry is operated by the Saskatchewan Ministry of Highways and Infrastructure. The ferry is free of tolls and operates between 6:30 AM and 11:30 PM, during the ice-free season.

The ferry transports almost 18,000 vehicles a year.

See also 
List of crossings of the South Saskatchewan River

References 

Duck Lake No. 463, Saskatchewan
Cable ferries in Canada
Ferries of Saskatchewan
St. Louis No. 431, Saskatchewan
Division No. 15, Saskatchewan